William Lawrence Wallace (12 April 1901 in Toronto, Ontario – 20 July 1967) was a Canadian rower who competed in the 1924 Summer Olympics. In 1924 he won the silver medal as crew member of the Canadian boat in the eights event.

References

External links
William Wallace's profile at databaseOlympics
William Wallace's profile at Sports Reference.com

1901 births
1967 deaths
Rowers from Toronto
Players of Canadian football from Ontario
Toronto Argonauts players
Canadian male rowers
Olympic rowers of Canada
Olympic silver medalists for Canada
Rowers at the 1924 Summer Olympics
Olympic medalists in rowing
Medalists at the 1924 Summer Olympics